Egor Konchalovsky (born January 15, 1966) is a Russian film director, screenwriter and producer. He is the son of director Andrei Konchalovsky and actress Natalya Arinbasarova.

Biography
Was born on January 15, 1966, in Moscow. 

He studied at the international school St Clare's at Oxford and at Kensington Business College. He holds an MA in Art History from the University of Cambridge. He worked as an assistant director in the films Homer and Eddie, Tango and Cash, The Inner Circle. In 1992, together with Andrey Razenkov, he created an advertising studio "PS TVC" (Partner Studio TVCommercials). Participated in the delivery of over a hundred promotional video clips. In 1999 he made his debut as a film director.

Filmography
 Zatvornik (1999)
 Antikiller (2002)
 Antikiller 2: Antiterror (2003)
 Escape (2005)
 Tins (2007)
 9 maya. Lichnoye otnoshenie (2008)
 Rozy dlya Elzy (2009)
 Our Masha and the Magic Nut (2009)
 Moscow, I Love You (2009)
 Returning to the 'A' (2011)
 On the Moon (2020)
 Moy papa - vozhd (2022)

References

External links 
 
 Egor Konchalovsky on kino-teatr.ru

Living people
Russian film directors
Russian screenwriters
1966 births